Tangential speech or tangentiality is a communication disorder in which the train of thought of the speaker wanders and shows a lack of focus, never returning to the initial topic of the conversation. It tends to occur in situations where a person is experiencing high anxiety, as a manifestation of  the psychosis known as schizophrenia, in dementia or in states of delirium. It is less severe than logorrhea and may be associated with the middle stage in dementia. It is, however, more severe than circumstantial speech in which the speaker wanders, but eventually returns to the topic.

Some adults with right hemisphere brain damage may exhibit behavior that includes tangential speech. Those who exhibit these behaviors may also have related symptoms such as seemingly inappropriate or self-centered social responses, and a deterioration in pragmatic abilities (including appropriate eye contact as well as topic maintenance).

Definition
The term refers simplistically to a thought disorder shown from speech with a lack of observance to the main subject of discourse, such that a person whilst  speaking on a topic deviates from the topic. Further definition  is of speech that deviates from an answer to a question that is relevant in the first instance but deviates from the relevancy to  related subjects not involved in a direct answering of the question. In the context of a conversation or discussion the communication is a response that is ineffective in that the form is inappropriate for adequate understanding. The person's speech seems to indicate that their attention to their own speech has perhaps in some way been overcome during the occurrence of cognition whilst speaking, causing the vocalized content to follow thought that is apparently without reference to the original idea or question; or the person's speech is considered evasive in that the person has decided to provide an answer to a question that is an avoidance of a direct answer.

History
The earlier phenomenological description (Schneider 1930;et al.) allowed for further definition on the basis of  formal characteristic rather than content, producing later practice relying upon clinical assessment (Andreasen 1979).  The term has undergone a re-definition to refer only to a persons speech in response to a question, and to provide the definition  separation from the  similar symptoms  loosening of association and derailment (Andreasen 1979).

Other
According to the St. Louis system for the diagnosis of schizophrenia, tangentiality is significantly associated with a low IQ prior to diagnosis  (AU Parnas et al  2007).

See also
 Aphasia
 Theories of communication
 Circumstantial speech
 Harold Lasswell

References

Aphasias
Symptoms and signs of mental disorders
Communication disorders